Euplexia triplaga is a cutworm or dart moth in the family Noctuidae. The species was first described by Francis Walker in 1857. It is found in Central America and North America.

The MONA or Hodges number for Euplexia triplaga is 9544.

References

Further reading

 
 
 

Euplexia
Articles created by Qbugbot
Moths described in 1857